"Be Alright" is a song by Australian singer and songwriter Dean Lewis. The song was released in June 2018 as the lead single from Lewis' debut studio album, A Place We Knew. It reached number one and is certified 10× Platinum in Australia and multi platinum worldwide, including 2× Platinum in the United States.

Lewis said: "'Be Alright' is actually written about a few different relationships, some were mine and some from friends, I took little bits and pieces from each experience and combined them into one song." He added: "For people worried about me cause the song's so sad — trust me I'm OK… the song is actually about hope and knowing that in the end things will work out, surrounding yourself with good people." Lyrically, the song is about dealing with a breakup and the reality that you have to move on.

An acoustic single was released on 7 September 2018.

At the ARIA Music Awards of 2018, "Be Alright" was nominated for four awards, winning the ARIA Award for Best Video.

At the APRA Music Awards of 2019, the song was nominated for Pop Work of the Year.

At the APRA Music Awards of 2021, the song won Most Performed Australian Work Overseas.

Music video
The music video for "Be Alright" was shot in Mexico City and directed by Los Angeles-based, Australian director Jessie Hill and features Mexican actor Maria Evoli as Lewis' love interest. The video was released on 12 July 2018.

Reception
Allison Gallagher from The Brag Magazine called the song "stunning" and "gut-wrenching", saying, "A frank and fairly candid meditation on romantic betrayal and moving past pain, Lewis delivers his lyrics above a relatively sparse, stripped back instrumentation. Punctuated with a swelling, hopeful chorus, 'Be Alright' is the kind of slow-burning balladry that's equal parts uplifting and devastating." RJ Frometa from Vents Magazine said, "[Lewis] perfectly captures gut-wrenching heartbreak that comes with the hardships of a break-up. But while it deals candidly with anguish, the chorus swells with hope; a recognition that this pain is only temporary."
auspOp called the song "a cracker", adding that "Be Alright" "feels like a big, bold step up."

Track listing

Charts

Weekly charts

Year-end charts

Decade-end charts

Certifications 

|+Certifications and sales for "Be Alright" by Dean Lewis

Release history

See also
 List of best-selling singles in Australia
 List of number-one singles of 2018 (Australia)
 List of number-one songs of 2018 (Singapore)

References

2018 singles
2018 songs
Dean Lewis songs
ARIA Award-winning songs
Number-one singles in Australia
Number-one singles in Singapore
Songs written by Jon Hume
APRA Award winners
Universal Music Australia singles
Songs written by Dean Lewis